Mohamed Bassiouny (born August 8, 1989) is an Egyptian professional footballer who currently plays as an attacking midfielder for the Egyptian club Enppi. He joined Enppi in 2016 in a free transfer from Ittihad El-Shorta.

References

External links
 
 

1989 births
Living people
ENPPI SC players
Ittihad El Shorta SC players
Al Merreikh SC (Egypt) players
Al Masry SC players
Egyptian footballers
Association football midfielders

ar:محمد بسيوني